The Nader Palace (Persian: کاخ نادر), the Kalat Palace (Persian: کاخ کلات) or the Sun Palace (Persian: کاخ خورشید) is a palace in Kalat (Nader Dejh), Iran. Built in 1738-1739, it is one of the few buildings that were built during the reign of Nader Shah Afshar. Its construction was cut short however after the assassination of the Shah.

It is currently used as a museum of anthropology.

History 
Coming back from his Indian campaign, he brought many Indian architect and engineer captives, which he ordered to construct him a palace in Kalat. The palace was meant to house the Shah's treasury, and the jewels he had taken from India. The namesake of the palace was a wife of Nader apparently, who was named "Khorshid", meaning "Sun". After Nader's demise the construction process was halted, which is clearly visible from the state of the building and the calligraphies and paintings.

Located in the middle of a large garden, it used to be 25 meters tall in 3 floors, but the third floor was ruined over time and the current height of the building does not exceed 20 meters.

There is evidence that the place was used as a residential headquarter in early Qajar era.

It was listed in the Iranian national heritage sites list in 10 February 1940 with the number 329.

References 

Kalat County
Buildings and structures in Razavi Khorasan Province
Afsharid Iran
18th-century establishments in Iran
National works of Iran
Buildings of the Qajar period
Museums in Iran
Tourist attractions in Razavi Khorasan Province